The president of the Royal Statistical Society is the head of the Royal Statistical Society (RSS), elected biennially by the Fellows of the Society. (The time-period between elections has varied in the past, and in fact elections only rarely occur.).

The president oversees the running of the Society and chairs its council meetings.  In recent years, almost all presidents have been nominated following many years' service to the Society, although some have been nominated to mark their eminence in society generally, such as Harold Wilson.

There has only been one contested election in the Society's history; in 1977, many fellows objected to the nomination by the Council of Campbell Adamson because he was not a statistician, was said to have made derogatory comments about statisticians, and principally because in the previous year he had been defeated in an election to the Council of the Society, and fellows felt that he was being foisted upon the Society by the current 'establishment' in an essentially undemocratic fashion.  Henry Wynn was nominated by several fellows (including Adrian Smith, himself later president, and Philip Dawid) and won the election.

Despite women being elected fellows from 1858, only five have been president of the society.

In 2010, Bernard Silverman stepped down very early in his presidential term. This was due to being appointed as chief scientific advisor to the Home Office which presented a conflict of interest as the society sometimes issues expert statements on statistical matters in public life. In 2022 then president-elect David Firth withdrew on health grounds, prompting a further election in which Andrew Garrett, the current president, was elected.

Honorary presidents 
Three Princes of Wales have been an honorary president:
 1872 - 1901 Albert Edward, Prince of Wales (later Edward VII)
 1902 - 1910 George, Prince of Wales (later George V)
 1921 - 1936 Edward, Prince of Wales (later Edward VIII)

List of presidents

19th century

20th century

21st century 
2001–2003 Peter Green
2003–2005 Andrew P. Grieve
2005–2007 Tim Holt
2008–2009 David Hand
2010–2010 Bernard Silverman (resigned Feb 2010; replaced pro tem by David Hand)
2011–2012 Valerie Isham
2013–2014 John Pullinger
2014–2016 Peter Diggle
2017–2018 David Spiegelhalter
2019–2020 Deborah Ashby
2021–2022 Sylvia Richardson
2023– Andrew Garrett

References

External links 
 Current president
 List of presidents

 
Royal Statistical Society
Royal Statistical Society
Royal Statistical Society
Statistics-related lists
Lists of British people
Lists of members of learned societies